The 24th Lambda Literary Awards were held on June 4, 2012, to honour works of LGBT literature published in 2011.

Special awards

Nominees and winners

External links
 24th Lambda Literary Awards

Lambda Literary Awards
Lambda
Lists of LGBT-related award winners and nominees
2012 in LGBT history
Lambda